Gilbert FitzRoy was an illegitimate son of Henry I of England. His maternity is unknown as well as almost everything about him, except that he was still young and unmarried in the 1140s. He died before 1143, at the age of ~12. His mother was likely either Isabella de Beaumont, Nest ferch Rhys, or Sybil Corbet.

Citations

References
 

12th-century English people
Illegitimate children of Henry I of England
12th-century deaths
Year of birth unknown
Sons of kings